Jin Meiling may refer to:
Birei Kin (born 1934), or Jin Meiling in pinyin, Taiwan-born Japanese critic and political activist
Meiling Jin (born 1956), Guyanese author